Engure Municipality is a former Latvian municipality situated partly in the region of Courland and partly in Vidzeme. It bordered Mērsrags municipality, Tukums municipality, Jūrmala and the Gulf of Riga. The municipality was formed in 2009 by merging Engure parish, Smārde parish and Lapmežciems parish, with the administrative centre being Smārde. The population in 2020 was 7,124.

On 1 July 2021, Engure Municipality ceased to exist and its territory was merged into Tukums Municipality.

Population

See also 
 Administrative divisions of Latvia (2009)

References 

 
Former municipalities of Latvia